Marseille has been the setting for many films, produced mostly in France or Hollywood.

Before 1950
 Barrabas (1920)
 Cœur fidèle (1923)
 Monte Cristo (1929)
 Marius (1931)
 Fanny (1932)
    (1935)
 César (1936)
 Passage to Marseille (1944)
 Inspecteur Sergil (1947)
 Sergil et le dictateur (1948)

1950–1959
 Sergil chez les filles (1952)
House on the Waterfront (1954)
 Mémoire d’un flic (1955)
 Le Couteau sous la gorge (1955)
 Honoré de Marseille (1956)
 Seven Thunders (1957)

1950–1979
 Fanny (1961)
 Je vous salue, mafia! (1965)
 Requiem pour une canaille (1967)
 L'armée des ombres (1969)
 Borsalino (1970)
 The French Connection (1971)
 Borsalino & Co. (1974)
 The Marseille Contract (1974)
 French Connection II (1975)

1980–1999
 Le Bar du téléphone (1980)
 La Lune dans le caniveau (1983)
 Le Marginal (1983)
 The Judge (1984)
 37°2 le matin (1986)
 Trois places pour le 26 (1988)
 Roselyne et les lions (1989)
 My Father's Glory (1990)
 My Mother's Castle (1990)
 Le Petit Criminel (1990)
 Un, deux, trois, soleil (1993)
 Bye-Bye (1995)
 Marius et Jeannette (1997)
 Taxi (1998)

2000 onwards
 Baise-moi (2000)
 Comme un aimant (2000)
 Taxi 2 (2000)
 Total Khéops (2001)
 The Bourne Identity (2002)
 Count of Monte Cristo (2002)
 The Transporter (2002)
  (2003)
 Love Actually (2003)
 Taxi 3 (2003)
 Lila Says (2004)
 Plus belle la vie (TV - 2004-2009)
 Taxi 4 (2006)
 MR 73 (2008)
 Traitor (2008)
 The Transporter 3 (2008)
 A Prophet (2009)
 Manmadhan Ambu (Tamil) (2010)
 Twiggy (2011) 
 The Snows of Kilimanjaro (2011 film)
 Fanny (2013)
 Marius (2013)
 The Connection (2014)
 Marseille (2015)
 In Memoriam (2015)
 Marseille (2016) 
 Transit (2018)
 Taxi 5 (2018)
 Stillwater (2021)
 BAC Nord (2021)

References 

 
Films
Marseille
Marseille